{{Automatic taxobox
|image = Pelophila borealis (Paykull) - ZooKeys-245-001-g006.jpeg
|image_caption =Pelophila borealis
| image_upright = .7
| taxon = Pelophila (beetle)
| authority = Dejean, 1826
| display_parents = 2
}}Pelophila is a genus of ground beetles in the family Carabidae. There are two described species in Pelophila.

Species
These two species belong to the genus Pelophila:
 Pelophila borealis (Paykull, 1790)
 Pelophila rudis'' (LeConte, 1863)

References

Nebriinae